The 1996 North Carolina lieutenant gubernatorial election was held on 5 November 1996, as part of the elections to the Council of State.  North Carolina also held a gubernatorial election on the same day, but the offices of Governor and Lieutenant Governor are elected independently.

The election was won by Democratic incumbent Dennis A. Wicker, who won a second term.  In the general election, Wicker defeated Republican Steve Arnold, a Guilford County commissioner, by 55% to 45%.

General election

Footnotes

Lieutenant Governor
1996
1996 United States lieutenant gubernatorial elections